Gastão Elias and André Ghem won the title after defeating Jonathan Eysseric and Miguel Ángel Reyes-Varela 6–4, 7–6(7–2) in the final.

Seeds

Draw

References
 Main Draw

2016 ATP Challenger Tour